Charles Marsh (July 10, 1765January 11, 1849) was an American politician from Vermont. He served as a  member of the United States House of Representatives.

Biography
Marsh was born in Lebanon in the Connecticut Colony, to Joseph Marsh and Dorothy Mason. He settled with his parents in Vermont before the Revolutionary War. After graduating from Dartmouth College in 1786, he studied law and was admitted to the bar. He began the practice of law in Woodstock, Vermont, where he continued to practice law for about fifty years. He became the senior member of the profession in Vermont, and among those who studied in his office in preparation to become attorneys was Nicholas Baylies, who served as a Justice of the Vermont Supreme Court. He was appointed by George Washington to be the U.S. Attorney for the District of Vermont, and served from 1797 until 1801.

Marsh was elected as a Federalist candidate to the Fourteenth United States Congress, serving from March 4, 1815 until March 3, 1817. He founded the American Colonization Society while in Washington.

He was prominent in the Dartmouth College controversy and was a trustee of Dartmouth College from 1809 until 1849. Marsh became a member of the American Board of Commissioners for Foreign Missions in 1809.

Marsh received the degree of LL.D. from Dartmouth College in 1828. He was a liberal benefactor of various missionary and Bible societies, president of the Vermont Bible Society, vice president of the American Bible Society, and vice president of the American Education Society.

Family life
Marsh married Anna Collins in 1789. They had two children, Charles Marsh and Anna Marsh. Marsh married Susan Perkins on June 3, 1798. They had five children together; Lyndon Arnold Marsh, George Perkins Marsh, Joseph Marsh, Sarah Marsh, and Charles Marsh.

Marsh's father, Joseph Marsh, was a Vermont officer in the American Revolution, a member of the Vermont House of Representatives, and the first Lieutenant Governor of Vermont. His son George Perkins Marsh (1801–1882) was an environmentalist, a member of the United States Congress, and a diplomat. His nephew James Marsh (1794–1842) was a noted Congregational clergyman and writer.

Death
Marsh died on January 11, 1849, in Woodstock, Vermont. He is interred in River Street Cemetery in Woodstock.

His early 19th-century house, now much altered with Victorian features, is the centerpiece of Marsh-Billings-Rockefeller National Historical Park and is a National Historic Landmark (primarily for its association with his son George Perkins Marsh), and his c. 1797 law office building (now a private residence and moved from its original location) is listed on the National Register of Historic Places.

Notes

References

Further reading
 "Men of Vermont: an illustrated biographical history of Vermonters and sons of Vermont" by Redfield Proctor, published by Transcript Publishing Company in 1894.

External links 
 
 
 Govtrack.us
 The Political Graveyard
 Litchfield Historical Society

1765 births
1849 deaths
Dartmouth College alumni
Burials in Vermont
Federalist Party members of the United States House of Representatives from Vermont
United States Attorneys for the District of Vermont